The Manhattan Life Insurance Building was a   tower on Broadway in the Financial District of Manhattan, New York City.

History 
The original structure at 64–66 Broadway was completed in 1894 to the designs of the architects of Kimball & Thompson, and was slightly extended north in 1904 to 68–70 Broadway. It was the first skyscraper to pass  in Manhattan.

The building was sold at least twice. In 1926, the Manhattan Life Insurance Company sold the building to Frederick Brown, who then re-sold it to the Manufacturer's Trust Company a few weeks later. Then, in 1928, Central Union Trust Company, whose headquarters were in adjacent structures to the north, bought 70 Broadway for an undisclosed sum, although the building was assessed at that time at $4 million. Following the Central Union Trust Company's sale of the buildings to the north to the Irving Trust Company, which then built a new skyscraper at 1 Wall Street, Central Union Trust moved to the Manhattan Life Building and modified the structures at 60, 62, and 70 Broadway.

The building was demolished to make way for an annex to 1 Wall Street, completed in 1965.  Sources vary about whether the year of demolition was 1963 or 1964.

See also
List of skyscrapers
List of early skyscrapers

References

Beaux-Arts architecture in New York City
Broadway (Manhattan)
Buildings and structures demolished in 1963
Commercial buildings completed in 1894
Demolished buildings and structures in Manhattan
Financial District, Manhattan
Former skyscrapers
Skyscraper office buildings in Manhattan